Duck the Halls: A Robertson Family Christmas is the first full-length Christmas album from the cast of A&E reality television series Duck Dynasty, released October 29, 2013, via UMG Nashville.

Background
The announcement of the album came on June 10, 2013 in the Music City Center during the CMA Music Festival in Nashville, Tennessee. It was revealed that Buddy Cannon is producing the album, and that it features the family's "special brand of Southern, down-home sense of humor." CEO of Duck Commander, Willie Robertson, was quoted as saying, "Christmas is an important holiday for us not only because of our strong faith but also our holiday family traditions. We're having a great time making this album. We hope you enjoy it."

Recording
The album features a number of traditional seasonal songs as well as originals written and performed by the Robertsons. Special guests include country stars Luke Bryan, George Strait, Josh Turner and Alison Krauss.

Release
Walmart released an exclusive 'ZinePak deluxe edition of Duck the Halls: A Robertson Family Christmas. The limited-edition package features the full-length album, plus one additional bonus track ("Santa Looked a Lot Like Daddy"), as well as a 64-page magazine with exclusive family interviews, photos, fun facts, holiday recipes, scented Christmas ornament, and gift-tag stickers. Walmart let voters decide between the choice of three covers which one will be on the special release.

Critical reception

Duck the Halls: A Robertson Family Christmas garnered mostly positive reception from music critics. Tammy Ragusa of Country Weekly gave the album a B+ rating and states: "If you're a big fan of the Robertson family from the hit A&E reality series Duck Dynasty (i.e., you buy every piece of merch bearing Willie's or Uncle Si's photo or the expression "Happy, Happy, Happy"), then get your wallet out. You're not going to want to go through this holiday season without Duck the Halls: A Robertson Family Christmas. Writing for Roughstock, Matt Bjorke adds: "It may come off as a bit of a novelty album people who don't follow the program but that doesn't mean it's not a well-made album, which Duck the Halls: A Robertson Family Christmas most definitely is." Daryl Addison of Great American Country writes: "Duck the Halls is a friendly celebration of the season that will have fans of Duck Dynasty asking for seconds."

Commercial performance
The album debuted at number four on the Billboard 200 chart and number one on the Billboard Top Country Albums chart, selling 69,000 copies in its first week of release. The album was behind another holiday album, Kelly Clarkson's Wrapped in Red, which debuted at number three with 70,000 copies. In its second week of release, Duck the Halls remained at number one on the Top Country Albums chart, seeing a slight sales increase to 73,000 copies. The album was certified Platinum by the RIAA on December 11, 2013, and it became the second best-selling Christmas album of 2013 with 745,000 copies sold in the US. As of December 2014, Duck the Halls has sold 807,000 copies in the United States.

Track listing
Source:

Personnel
Credits adapted from AllMusic

The Robertsons
 Robertson Kids — featured artist
 Jase Robertson — featured artist, arranger, primary artist
 Jep Robertson — featured artist
 Korie Robertson — arranger
 Missy Robertson — arranger, pre-production arranger, primary artist
 Phil Robertson — featured artist, primary artist
 Reed Robertson — primary artist
 Sadie Robertson — primary artist
 Uncle Si Robertson — featured artist, primary artist
 Willie Robertson — arranger, primary artist

Technical personnel
 Natthapol Abhigantaphard — assistant
 Eric Adkins — photography
 Daniel Baacigalupi — assistant
 Sorrel Brigman — assistant
 Jake Burns — assistant
 Buddy Cannon — arranger, production
 Tony Castle — engineer, mixing
 Leland Elliott — assistant
 Shannon Finnegan — production coordinator
 Tom Freitag — assistant
 Scott Frick — assistant
 Carl Gorodetzky — contractor

 Adam Grover — assistant
 Jonathan Harter — assistant
 Sam Howard — assistant
 Andrew Mendelson — mastering
 Karen Naff — art direction, design
 Ernesto Olvera — assistant
 Derek Parnell — assistant
 John Pirkey — pre-production arranger
 Eberhard Ramm — copyist
 Pamela Sixfin — concert mistress
 Bergen White — string arrangements, vocal arrangement
 Brian Wright — A&R

Additional musicians

 David Angell — strings
 Monisa Angell — strings
 Sam Bacco — percussion
 Wyatt Beard — background vocals
 Jim "Moose" Brown — piano
 Pat Buchanan — electric guitar
 Buddy Cannon — background vocals
 Melonie Cannon — background vocals
 Tony Castle — piano
 Jim Chapman — background vocals
 Janet Darnall — strings
 David Davidson — strings
 Beverly Drukker — strings
 Dan Dugmore — electric guitar, baritone guitar, steel guitar
 Conni Ellisor — violin
 Kevin "Swine" Grantt — bass guitar
 James Grosjean — strings
 Steve Herman — trumpet
 Steve Hinson — electric guitar, steel guitar
 Jim Horn — flute
 Jon Mark Ivey — background vocals
 Shane Keister — piano, synthesizer
 Elizabeth Lamb — strings
 Paul Leim — drums
 Jim Lotz — bassoon
 Randy McCormick — clavinet, Hammond B3, piano, synthesizer
 Liana Manis — background vocals
 Anthony La Marchina — strings
 Jon Mark — background vocals
 The Nashville String Machine — strings
 Daniel O'Lannerghty — bass guitar
 Mary Kathryn Van Osdale — strings
 Carole Rabinowitz — strings
 Mickey Raphael — harmonica
 John Wesley Ryles — background vocals
 Joe Scaife — percussion
 Lisa Silver — background vocals
 Pamela Sixfin — strings
 Kira Small — background vocals
 Denis Solee — clarinet
 Joe Spivey — fiddle
 Bobby Terry — acoustic guitar
 Dan Tyminski — acoustic guitar, mandolin
 Alan Umstead — strings
 Catherine Umstead — strings
 Bruce Wethey — strings
 Bergen White — piano, background vocals
 Kristin Wilkinson — strings
 John Willis — acoustic guitar, electric guitar, gut string guitar
 Lonnie Wilson — drums
 Karen Winkelmann — strings
 Cindy Wyatt — harp

Charts and certifications

Weekly charts

Year-end charts

Decade-end charts

Certifications

References

External links
 Official website
 Duck The Halls Facebook Page
 

2013 Christmas albums
Christmas albums by American artists
Albums produced by Buddy Cannon
Universal Music Group Christmas albums
Robertson family
Country Christmas albums